Zoran Milidrag (born 29 February 1960) is a Bosnian-Herzegovinian football manager and former player.

Playing career

Club
During his playing career he played as midfielder for FK Famos Hrasnica, NK Čelik Zenica, FK Bačka 1901 and Sartid Smederevo. He also played with FK Spartak Subotica during the mid-1990s.

Managerial career
After retiring he became a football manager.  He was the coach of FK Spartak Zlatibor Voda, first as assistant during 2009 and later as the main coach in 2010. He coached FK Bačka Topola in the Serbian League Vojvodina during 2011.  He was the coach of FK Radnički Bajmok before being appointed as the new head coach of FK Bačka 1901 on 9 April 2012.

References

http://www.index.hr/forum/default.aspx?q=t&idf=21&idt=67410&p=3
Zoran Milidrag born: 29.2.1960

External links
 Yugoslav League stats 1974-1991 at B92

1960 births
Living people
Footballers from Sarajevo
Yugoslav footballers
Bosnia and Herzegovina footballers
Association football midfielders
FK Famos Hrasnica players
NK Čelik Zenica players
FK Bačka 1901 players
FK Spartak Subotica players
FK Smederevo players
Yugoslav First League players
First League of Serbia and Montenegro players
Bosnia and Herzegovina expatriate footballers
Expatriate footballers in Serbia and Montenegro
Bosnia and Herzegovina expatriate sportspeople in Serbia and Montenegro
Bosnia and Herzegovina football managers
FK TSC Bačka Topola managers
FK Bačka 1901 managers
Bosnia and Herzegovina expatriate football managers
Expatriate football managers in Serbia